Arsentiy Oleksandrovych Doroshenko is a professional Ukrainian footballer who plays as an attacking midfielder for Kolos Kovalivka. He was born on 27 June 2000

References

External links
 
 

2000 births
Living people
Footballers from Dnipro
Ukrainian footballers
FC Dnipro players
FC Kolos Kovalivka players
FC Podillya Khmelnytskyi players
FC Kramatorsk players
Ukrainian First League players
Ukrainian Second League players
Association football midfielders
Doroshenko family